GA&A Productions S.r.l. is an Italian distribution and production film company founded in 1990 by Gioia Avantaggiato, which operates in cinema and television. During its business, GA&A Productions collaborated with leading Italian television networks, from RAI to Mediaset to La7. The company, which works in the field of cinema, documentary and television shows, also acts on the international stage and has co-produced documentaries with channels such as Arte, Channel 4, ZDF, CBC, National Geographic, Discovery Channel, NHK Japan and SBS Australia. The company is also involved in film distribution. Among its catalogue:
 Burma VJ, Oscar-winning candidate (2010)
 When You’re Strange – A Film About The Doors (2010) 
 Marina Abramović – The Artist is Present (2012), winner of the Panorama Audience Award for Best Documentary at the 2012 Berlin International Film Festival
 Last Men in Aleppo (2016)

Filmography
Dictators' Nightmare, in association with RTS, Histoire/TF1 and VIASAT (2022)
Urbino: The Ideal City Of The Renaissance, in collaboration with RAI Cultura (2022)
Dante's Divine Politics, a GA&A Productions/ARTLINE production, in coproduction with RAI Documentari and ARTE Geie (2021) IMDB
Libya: Gaddafi’s Bloody Legacy, in coproduction with Gruppe5 and ZDF and in association with Arte, RAI Documentari, RTS, SVT, NRK (2021)
Susanna Tamaro, Unplugged, in collaboration with RAI Cultura (2021)
Art Rider season 2, in collaboration with Rai Cultura (2021)
Baia, the Atlantis of Rome, in coproduction with Filmare, in collaboration with RAI Cultura (2021)
The Mystery of the Trojan Horse - On the Trail of a Myth, in coproduction with Gruppe 5, in association with ARTE and ZDF Enterprises (2021)
Yemen, despite the war, in collaboration with RAI3, ZDF.info and AL JAZEERA Arabic (2021)
Black Samurai, in collaboration with RAI3 and SRC (2020)
Art Rider, in collaboration with Rai Cultura (2020)
Venezuela, the curse of oil (2019), in coproduction with Gruppe 5 / ZDF, in association with ARTE, TSR, NRK and SVT 
Io sono Sofia (2019), produced for Rai 3
WorkTrotter, (2018), reality series in coproduction with Rai 4
 Our Man In Cairo (2018), in coproduction with Gruppe 5 / ZDF in association with Arte 
 Fascio e Compasso (2018), in association with Rai 3
 Young Midwives (2017), in coproduction with Digicast
 Hidden Gems of Italy (2017), in coproduction with Digicast
 Behind The Altar (2017), in coproduction with ZDF/Arte and EO IkonDocs, in association with SVT, Yle, NRK, VRT, RTS, RSI, SRC
 Leonardo: the Man Who Saved Science (2017), in coproduction with THIRTEEN Pro-ductions LLC for WNET, France 5/Pro-gramme 33 and SBS Australia
 Passeggiate romane (2016), in association with RAI Cinema and in collaboration with RAI Teche. Produced with the support of MIBACT – Direzione Cinema
 Eating history – The Story of Italy on a Plate (2016), in association with A&E Networks Italy, SBS-TV, Autentic GmbH and Viasat
 Angeli (2015), produced for RTI S.p.a.
 Sicily Jass – The World's First Man in Jazz (2015), in coproduction with MRF5, in association with Rai Cinema, in collaboration with LAZY FILM. Produced with the support of MIBACT – Direzione Cinema and Regione Sicilia
 The Cross & The Gun (2015), in association with ZDF/Arte, in collaboration with AETN, CBC, SRC, SVT, DR, NRK, RTS, VRT
 Holy Money (2014), in coproduction with ZDF/Arte and Al Jazeera America, in association with CBC, CBC-SRC, RTS, VRT, NRK, SVT, DR
 We Were Gladio (2014), in coproduction with LCP (France), RTBF/Les Films de la Passerelle. Produced with the support of the MEDIA Programme of the European Union
 The troublemaker – Behind the Scenes of United Nations (2014), in collaboration with SIRK Productions
 Just a Shot (2013), in collaboration with RAI La storia siamo noi 
 Le battaglie dei giganti (2013), produced for Fox Channel/History Italia
 Benedict's Via Dolorosa (2013), in co-production with La7
 The Pope & I (2013), in coproduction with ZDF, in collaboration with Arte 
 Opening Act (2013), in coproduction with ESTER Produzioni. In competition at Torino Film Festival 2013
 My Travels With Cecilia (2013), in association with RAI Cinema and ElephantFilm. Produced with the support of MIBACT, ApuliaFilm Commission and Cineteca di Bologna
 Magnifico mondo (2012), in association with Reti Televisive Italiane S.p.a.
 Nome in codice Gladio (2012), in collaboration with RAI La storia siamo noi
 Malaria. Hitler's Secret Weapon (2012), in collaboration with RAI, produced with the support of the MEDIA Programme of the European Union 
 Last Chance Teachers (2011), in association with Lichtpunt
 La strage di Natale (2011), produced for RAI La Storia siamo noi
 Una vita per i campesinos (2011), in collaboration with Rai3, Geo&Geo
 Infanzia incarcerata (2011), in collaboration with Rai3, Geo&Geo
 Disasters Chronicles (2011), in association with Reti Televisive Italiane S.p.a.
 Ferrhotel (2011), in collaboration with Consiglio regionale della Puglia, Winner of the UCCA Award – 29° Film Festival
 Homeless United (2010), in coproduction with Ruvido Produzioni
 The Twin Attacks (2009), in association with RAI Educational and Fox International Channels 
 Tamil, indiani a Palermo (2009), produced for Rai3, Geo&Geo
 Antonio, maestro falconiere (2009) produced for Rai3, Geo&Geo
 My Life with Volcanoes (2009), in collaboration with Rai3, Geo&Geo
 Comic Books go to War (2009), in coproduction with ZDF/Arte and AVRO. In collaboration with SVT, Yle, RTS, RTBF, VRT, SF, SBS, ORF. Produced with the support of the MEDIA Programme of the European Union and produced with the support of the Media TV Broadcasting
 Journey to the Giant Crystal Cave (2008), in coproduction with TelFrance, Arte, NHK, in association with RTBF and La7
 Naica, Secrets of the Giant Crystal Cave (2008), in coproduction with C/Producciones, TelFrance, Discovery Canada, National Geographic Channel, Arte France, La7, NHK and Discovery Latin America
 Mussolini's Dirty War (2008), in coproduction with ERT, in association with RT, History Channel Italy, RSI, Histoire. Produced with the support of the MEDIA Programme of the European Union
 Gnam! (2007), in coproduction with Rai3
 Yamana, Nomads of the Fire (2007) in association with Rai 3 and MT Channel
 ABC Colombia (2007), in coproduction with Les Films d'Ici/Arte France and ITVS, in association with Channel 4, Yle. Produced with the support of the MEDIA Programme of the European Union
 Volcano Hunt (2006), in coproduction with Per Diem Films, Arte, RTI and in association with SBS, RTBF, Planète. Produced with the support of MEDIA TV Broadcasting
 Il Trasloco del Bar di Vezio (2005), in coproduction with Planet Italia
 Carvilius, a Riddle from the Past (2005), produced for Discovery US, in association with SBS – TV Australia
 Viminale – Mussolini's last Ship (2004), produced with the support of the MEDIA Programme of the European Union
 Old Elephant Route (2001), in coproduction with Les Films d'ici, Animal Planet – in association with Aane Mane Foundation and Telepiù
 The Train to the Opera (2000)
 Soul & Soil (2000)

References

Film distribution
Film production companies of Italy
Entertainment companies established in 1990
Mass media companies established in 1990